All the Lives We Never Lived is a novel by Anuradha Roy which was published on 14 May 2018 by Hachette India. In 2022, it was awarded the Sahitya Akademi Award.

Plot 
The novel is about Myshkin and his mother Gayatri who was an artist. His mother abandons the family for chasing of freedom. In that time, Nazism came in power then an artist from Gayatri's past who was an German seeks her out.

Critical reception 
Kamila Shamsie of The Guardian wrote "Roy's novel is a beautifully written amalgam of fictional and famous lives grappling with love and loss", Seán Hewitt of The Irish Times wrote "The scope of All the Lives We Never Lived is vast but also personal, both in temporal and geographical terms.", Fathima M of The Wire wrote "this extraordinary novel has figured on many short or long 'lists' this season of literary prizes, it must be read, if nothing else, for its artistic value.", Chandrima S. Bhattachary of The Telegraph wrote "Each word in Anuradha Roy's novel hits the right note. But the book has its flaws" and Leah Franqui of The New York Times wrote ""All the Lives We Never Lived" feels more like a rumination than a story.".

The book has also been reviewed by Ron Charles of The Washington Post, Hansda Sowvendra Shekhar of The Hindu, Erica Pearson of Star Tribune and Naina Bajekal of Time.

Awards 
Sahitya Akademi Award in 2022
Shortlisted for International Dublin Literary Award in 2020
Shortlisted for The Hindu Literary Prize in 2018
Longlisted for Walter Scott Prize in 2019
Longlisted for JCB Prize in 2018
Fiction book of the year by Tata Literature Live Awards in 2018

References 

2018 Indian novels
Novels by Anuradha Roy (novelist)
Hachette India books
English-language novels
Novels set in India